Tim Smits (born 11 April 1986) is an Australian footballer who plays for Grange Thistle.

Club career
Smits began his career with North Pine SC, he then moved to Albany Creek and then to the QAS. At the Queensland Academy of Sport he spent three years, after this, he joined Pine Rivers United where he played two years. In January 2006, Smits was scouted by Netherlands club Helmond Sport, where he played for the reserve team, after one year in the Netherlands, he moved back to Australia and signed with Rochedale Rovers. In January 2008, after playing nine games in one year for Rochedale, he joined A-League club Brisbane Roar.

A-League statistics

1 - includes A-League final series statistics
2 - includes FIFA Club World Cup statistics; AFC Champions League statistics are included in season commencing after group stages (i.e. ACL and A-League seasons etc.)

References

External links
 Queensland Roar profile

1986 births
Australian expatriate soccer players
A-League Men players
Brisbane Roar FC players
Australian people of Dutch descent
Soccer players from Brisbane
National Premier Leagues players
Living people
Association football forwards
Grange Thistle SC players
Australian soccer players